Bushwick Leaders High School for Academic Excellence (BLHS) was a small New York City Public High School located in Bushwick, Brooklyn.

History 

Bushwick Leaders High School was opened in 2002 serving only 9th graders and starting with fewer than 100 students. The school served 9th through 12th graders with more than 400 students on its roster at peak enrollment. Its original location was 271 Melrose Street.

The creator and principal of Bushwick Leaders is Catherine Reilly.

In 2019, the high school was placed on the state status list due to low state test scores, notably in math. The school later announced it would be closing in 2022 and merging with neighboring schools.

Advanced Placement (AP) and Honors 

Several AP and Honors courses could be taken at Bushwick Leaders such as AP Spanish, AP Statistics, and AP Chemistry.

Dress code 

The school used a dress code as follows: Males can wear a light blue or white polo that says BLHS (the school's initials) with black slacks. Sneakers can be worn but must be black-on-black, and the same is true for boots and shoes. Females must also wear polos in the same colors (light blue and white) and also must wear black slacks or long skirts. No flipflops are allowed.

References

External links 
 School website

See also
Education in New York City
List of high schools in New York City

Public high schools in Brooklyn
Educational institutions established in 2002
2002 establishments in New York City